In the history of journalism in Russia, thick journal or thick magazine was a type of literary magazine, regarded to be an important tradition originated in Russian Empire, continued through the times of the Soviet Union and into the modern Russia.  The name comes from its format: a typical 19th-century issue of a "thick journal" was 300–500 pages, appeared several times a year. The volume was roughly divided between literary publications (short stories, serialized novels, drama, poetry, etc., including translations) and journalism (criticism of literature, arts, music, political and social reviews and essays, calendars and reviews of current events, etc). In late Russian Empire it was a major vehicle of propagation of culture across the vast expanses of the country, as well as a major component of cultural life of Russian emigres. Notable examples of early "thick journals" include Вестник Европы, «Московский телеграф», «Телескоп», «Библиотека для чтения», «Современник», «Отечественные записки», «Мир божий»,  «Жизнь», «Образование», «Современная жизнь».

References

Literary magazines published in Russia